Vicky Bastarache (born 16 May 1973) is a Canadian softball player. She competed in the women's tournament at the 2000 Summer Olympics.

References

External links
 

1973 births
Living people
Canadian softball players
Olympic softball players of Canada
Softball players at the 2000 Summer Olympics
People from Kent County, New Brunswick
Sportspeople from New Brunswick